Golden Resources Shopping Mall, or Jin Yuan (abbreviated from Chinese: 金源时代购物中心) is a major shopping mall located near the northwest Fourth Ring Road in Haidian District, Beijing, People's Republic of China. At the time of opening it was the largest mall by gross leasable area. In 2005, it became the world's second-largest mall when South China Mall in Dongguan, China was completed. It can be accessed by the Beijing Subway using Changchunqiao Station on Line 10.

At 1.5 times the size of the Mall of America, Golden Resources Mall was the world's largest shopping mall from 2004 to 2005.

The mall was completed on 20 October 2004 after 20 months of construction and opened four days later. The developer of the mall initially estimated that the mall would have 50,000 shoppers a day, however upon opening the actual number was far smaller, as few as 20 in an hour. At the time, prices of most goods sold inside the mall were far beyond the purchasing ability of most ordinary Chinese. In addition, the mall was relatively inaccessible due to it being located in what was the sparsely populated outer suburbs of the Beijing between the 3rd and 4th ring road. 

Fu Yuehong, general manager of the New Yansha Group which operates nearly half the mall, explains:

From the beginning we wanted the largest shopping center in the world [...] We are the country with the most people in the world. We have the fastest growing economy. The largest mall shows our progress as a society [...] We think it will take three to five years to start making a profit.

Today, with the growth of the Chinese middle class, the number of shoppers has increased tremendously over the years with the mall being crowded on weekends. A second phase of the mall opened across the street. Urban expansion of Beijing now places the mall in the urban area of Beijing, surrounded by numerous apartment complexes.

The opening of Beijing Subway Line 10 Changchunqiao station in 2012 improved access to the mall. An additional subway line serving the mall, Line 12 is under construction with opening slated for 2023.

See also
List of largest shopping malls in the world
List of shopping malls in China

References

External links
Official website

Buildings and structures completed in 2004
Shopping malls in Beijing
Shopping malls established in 2004